James Jimmy Kidega (born 16 August 1982) is an Ugandan former footballer who played as a midfielder.

Early and personal life
Born in Jinja, his brother is Moses Oloya, who also played international football for Uganda.

Career
Kidega played club football for SC Villa, Express, Rayon Sports, La Passe, Gulu United, Uganda Revenue Authority, Chanthaburi and Bontang. He also earned two caps for the Ugandan national team.

References

1982 births
Living people
Ugandan footballers
Uganda international footballers
SC Villa players
Express FC players
Rayon Sports F.C. players
La Passe FC players
Gulu United FC players
Uganda Revenue Authority SC players
Jimmy Kidega
Bontang F.C. players
Association football midfielders
Ugandan expatriate footballers
Ugandan expatriate sportspeople in Rwanda
Expatriate footballers in Rwanda
Ugandan expatriate sportspeople in Seychelles
Expatriate footballers in Seychelles
Ugandan expatriate sportspeople in Thailand
Expatriate footballers in Thailand
Ugandan expatriate sportspeople in Indonesia
Expatriate footballers in Indonesia